Karla May (born June 12, 1970) is an American politician who has served in the Missouri Senate since January 2019. She previously served in the Missouri House of Representatives from 2011. A member of the Democratic Party, she was first elected in 2010. Having served the maximum allowable term in the state house, in 2018 she announced her intention to run for election to the Missouri State Senate.

Prior to entering politics, May worked for AT&T, also serving as a shop steward of Local 6300 of the Communications Workers of America. She received her bachelor's degree from Saint Louis University in business administration, and a master's degree in education from Lindenwood University.

May challenged and defeated incumbent State Senator Jacob Hummel (4th district) in the 2018 Democratic primary.

Electoral history

State Representative

State Senate

References

1970 births
Living people
AT&T people
Lindenwood University alumni
Democratic Party members of the Missouri House of Representatives
Democratic Party Missouri state senators
Politicians from St. Louis
Saint Louis University alumni
21st-century American politicians
Women state legislators in Missouri
21st-century American women politicians